Mahaanta ( Eminence)  is a 1997 Hindi-language action drama film, produced by Ayub Khan under the Ayesha Film banner and directed by Afzal Khan. It stars Jeetendra, Sanjay Dutt, Madhuri Dixit, Shakti Kapoor and music composed by Laxmikant Pyarelal. Filming began in 1991 and was delayed for 6 years due to Dutt’s arrests in 1993 and Dutt and Dixit breaking up their relationship.

Plot
Young Vijay studies in Good Shepherd High School and lives a wealthy lifestyle in a small scenic town along with his uncle, who is the Inspector General of Police in Bombay and has a close friend called Raj Malhotra. When both mature, Vijay gets married, while Raj marries Shanti. On his uncle's insistence, Vijay departs to live in Bombay, where he eventually becomes the Police Commissioner. Subsequently, Raj, Shanti, and Raj's brother, Sanjay, also re-locate to Bombay, where they are united with Vijay. Then Sanjay falls in love with Jenny and both want to get married, much to the chagrin of Mahesh, who wants to marry her at any and all costs. Mahesh is the only son of wealthy and influential Kedar, who manages to convince Edward that it will be in Jenny's and Sanjay's best interest if Jenny weds Mahesh. The marriage is arranged, but on that very day, Sanjay steps in, humiliates Kedar and marries Jenny. That night Sanjay is arrested by none other than Vijay himself and placed in a cell. The next morning he is released and returns home to find that his brother and sister-in-law are both dead. Sanjay swears to avenge their deaths as well as find out why Vijay betrayed Raj and arrested him on his wedding night.

After learning that Kedarnath killed Sanjay's brother and sister-in-law, Sanjay confronts and challenges him that he will kill him in same place but will not remove evidence. Despite of Jenny and Vijay's attempt to stop him, he goes to kill Kedarnath, his son Mahesh, corrupt Inspector P.K. Dubey and his henchman Nanubhai Chatewala.

Sanjay chases and kills Mahesh in night of New Year Eve. Then chases Inspector Dubey in meat market then chops him and hang him to death by metal hook. Sanjay suddenly learns that Vijay actually put him into jail to save his life and realizes his mistake. He also learns that Kedarnath lured Vijay to get him killed on Ganesh Chaturthi festival so he reaches there and saves him. And he kills Nanunbhai on hand to hand combat.

After killing 3 of them, Sanjay lures Kedarnath to his industry and tries to get him killed on same places and same way his brother and sister-in-law were killed, but police force lead by Vijay finally comes to stop him. Sanjay's surrender to comes to halt when unconscious Kedarnath wakes up and tries to shoot Sanjay but Vijay gets shot when he saved him and Sanjay shoots Kedarnath to death. After Vijay gets recovered, he and Sanjay gets emotionally united.

Cast
Jeetendra as Police Commissioner Vijay Kapoor 
Sanjay Dutt as Sanjay Malhotra
Madhuri Dixit as Jenny Malhotra 
Mohsin Khan as Raj Malhotra 
Poonam Dhillon as Vijay's wife 
Saeed Jaffrey as Inspector General of Police 
Satyendra Kapoor as Edward Pinto 
Shakti Kapoor as Inspector P.K. Dubey 
Raza Murad as The Narrator 
Amrish Puri as Seth. Kedar Nath 
Paresh Rawal as  Nanubhai Chathewala 
Sumalatha as Shanti Malhotra 
Kishore Anand Bhanushali as Sanjay's friend 
Tej Sapru as Mahesh Nath 
Snehal Dabi as Sanjay's friend 
Brij Gopal as Kelkar (Informer) 
Shashi Kiran as Sanjay's friend 
Mehmood Jr. as Sanjay's friend 
Tariq Shah as  Inspector Aslam Sher Khan 
Gurbachchan Singh as Ujagar

Soundtrack
Music by: Laxmikant-Pyarelal & Lyricist: Anand Bakshi

References

External links 
 

1997 films
1990s Hindi-language films
Films scored by Laxmikant–Pyarelal
1990s action drama films
Indian action drama films
Indian films about revenge
1990s masala films